Xenopsylla brasiliensis is a species of flea found on rats. It is a vector of bubonic plague, and is found in South America, Africa, and India.

References

Pulicidae
Insects described in 1904